Paolo Bozzi was an Italian psychologist, philosopher, composer, and violin player. He was born in Gorizia on May 16, 1930 and died in Bolzano in 2003.

He made a number of important discoveries in psychology of perception and thought, most notably the phenomenon of auditory streaming. He was one of the first to defend the idea of a systematic study of naïve physics, and a precursor of experimental philosophy.

References 

Italian cognitive scientists
1930 births
2003 deaths
20th-century psychologists